Vladimir Vladimirovich Dubrovshchik (born January 7, 1972, in Hrodna) is a former Belarusian discus thrower who won the Olympic silver medal in 1996. He is also the 1994 European champion and 1995 World Championships silver medallist, and he finished fourth at the 1997 World Championships. In 2000 he set his personal best throw with 69.28 metres. He retired after the 2001 season.

Achievements

External links
 rzutyiskoki.pl author Leszek Albiniak 
 
 

Belarusian male discus throwers
1972 births
Living people
Athletes (track and field) at the 1996 Summer Olympics
Athletes (track and field) at the 2000 Summer Olympics
Olympic athletes of Belarus
Olympic silver medalists for Belarus
Sportspeople from Grodno
World Athletics Championships medalists
European Athletics Championships medalists
Medalists at the 1996 Summer Olympics
Olympic silver medalists in athletics (track and field)
Universiade medalists in athletics (track and field)
Universiade gold medalists for Belarus
Medalists at the 1997 Summer Universiade